Dragonar may refer to:
 Metal Armor Dragonar, a 1987 anime series with 48 episodes
 Dragonar Academy, a 2010 light novel series adapted into a 2011 manga and 2014 anime with 12 episodes